Devil in Ohio is an American suspense thriller limited series created by Daria Polatin based on Polatin's book of the same name for Netflix. The series consists of eight episodes and was released on September 2, 2022.

Plot summary 
Mae, a teenager with an inverted pentagram carved into her back, shows up in an Ohio hospital. Her case sparks the interest of hospital psychiatrist Dr. Suzanne Mathis, who offers to put the girl up in her home while looking for a suitable foster family. It's soon discovered that Mae escaped a devil-worshipping cult in the rural neighboring county. Authorities have long tried to investigate the cult, but have been blocked by religious freedom issues and a fiercely protective county sheriff. It's not long before Mae's presence causes upheaval in the Mathis family.

Cast and characters

Main 
 Emily Deschanel as Dr. Suzanne Mathis, a hospital psychiatrist
 Sam Jaeger as Peter Mathis, Suzanne's husband who is a real estate developer
 Gerardo Celasco as Detective Lopez, a detective who is investigating Mae's case
 Madeleine Arthur as Mae, a levelheaded and stoic teen whose identity is as mysterious as she
 Xaria Dotson as Jules Mathis, Suzanne and Peter's fifteen-year-old daughter
 Alisha Newton as Helen Mathis, Suzanne's and Peter's oldest daughter who is a high school senior
 Naomi Tan as Dani Mathis, Suzanne's and Peter's youngest daughter

Recurring 

 Marci T. House as Adele Thornton
 Bradley Stryker as Sheriff Wilkins
 Jason Sakaki as Isaac Kimura
 Evan Ellison as Sebastian Zelle
 Ty Wood as Teddy Harrington
 Cynthia Khalifeh as Rasha Shams
 Djouliet Amara as Tatiana Nelson
 Tahmoh Penikett as Malachi
 Eva Bourne as Gina Brooks
 Keenan Tracey as Noah

In addition, Samantha Ferris co-stars as Rhoda Morrison.

Episodes

Production

Development 
On September 15, 2021, it was announced that Netflix gave an eight-episode series order to Devil in Ohio, a limited series based on Daria Polatin's novel. Polatin, Rachel Miller, and Andrew Wilder are executive producers, and Ian Hay serves as producer. Polatin also serves as showrunner. The limited series premiered on September 2, 2022.

Casting 
Alongside the series announcement, Emily Deschanel, Sam Jaeger, Gerardo Celasco, Madeleine Arthur, Xaria Dotson, Alisha Newton, and Naomi Tan were cast. Djouliet Amara, Jason Sakaki, Marci T. House, Samantha Ferris, Bradley Stryker, Evan Ellison, Ty Wood, Stacey Farber, Tahmoh Penikett, and Keenan Tracey were cast in October 2021.

Filming 
Filming began on September 8, 2021, in Vancouver, Canada, and wrapped on December 13, 2021.

Reception
The review aggregator website Rotten Tomatoes reported a 50% approval rating with an average rating of 5.3/10, based on 12 critic reviews. The website's critics consensus reads, "Devil in Ohio may provide some lurid kicks for viewers in the mood for satanic suds, but this thriller's biggest sin is squandering a hellish hook with blasé execution." Metacritic, which uses a weighted average, assigned a score of 56 out of 100 based on 4 critics, indicating "mixed or average reviews".

References

External links 
 
 

2020s American drama television miniseries
2022 American television series debuts
2022 American television series endings
American thriller television series
English-language Netflix original programming
Satanism in popular culture
Television series about cults
Television shows based on American novels
Television shows filmed in Vancouver
Television shows set in Ohio